Andrew Owen Mumford (born 18 June 1981 in Neath) is a retired Welsh footballer

Life and career 

Having come up through the age groups at LLanelli Town under the tutelage of former Welsh international Leighton James, Mumford passed up a short term contract offer from Newcastle United in order to sign with Swansea City (where James himself spent several years as a player) in the summer of 2000.

Short spells on loan at Haverfordwest County and Port Talbot Athletic that season saw him gain further first team experience before he made his Swansea debut at Port Vale in April 2001.

The following season saw Mumford become a regular and end it as the clubs youngest ever player of the year as the team narrowly avoided relegation from the Football League.

Several injuries curtailed his development however and following further loan periods to Newport County and Aldershot Town his contract was allowed to expire and he moved to Australia to play for Sydney FC in the inaugural A-League season.

After just one season in Australia he moved back to Wales, with stints at Welsh League teams Port Talbot Athletic, LLanelli Town, Afan Lido and Haverfordwest County before retiring in 2012.

References

External links 

 

Living people
1981 births
Welsh footballers
Swansea City A.F.C. players
Llanelli Town A.F.C. players
Newport County A.F.C. players
Aldershot Town F.C. players
Aberystwyth Town F.C. players
English Football League players
Cymru Premier players
Afan Lido F.C. players
Haverfordwest County A.F.C. players
Port Talbot Town F.C. players
Association football midfielders